Edward Crew may refer to:
 Edward Crew (RAF officer) (1917–2002), English officer and flying ace
 Edward Crew (police officer) (born 1946), English chief constable